Sphinx nogueirai is a moth of the family Sphingidae. It is known from Sonora in Mexico.

References

Sphinx (genus)
Moths described in 2002
Endemic Lepidoptera of Mexico
Moths of North America